Hovtamej (also Romanized as Ovtamech and Hovtamech; formerly, Mughan and Mughanjik) is a town in the Armavir Province of Armenia. The town's church dates from the 19th century.

See also 
Armavir Province

References 

World Gazeteer: Armenia – World-Gazetteer.com

Populated places in Armavir Province